The blue-lored antbird (Hafferia immaculata) is a species of antbird in the family Thamnophilidae. It is found at low levels in humid Andean forests in western and northern Colombia, western Venezuela. It formerly included the Zeledon's antbird as a subspecies. The blue-lored antbird feeds on insects, and regularly follows swarms of army ants in order to catch prey flushed by the swarms, but it is not an obligate ant-follower like some species of antbirds. The blue-lored antbird is strongly sexually dichromatic: the male has an entirely black plumage, while the female has a rufous-brown plumage and a black mask. Both sexes have a blue patch of skin around the eyes.

This species was previously included in the genus Myrmeciza. A molecular phylogenetic study published in 2013 found that Myrmeciza, as then defined, was polyphyletic. In the resulting rearrangement to create monophyletic genera the blue-lored antbird was moved to the newly erected genus Hafferia.

References

blue-lored antbird
Birds of the Colombian Andes
Birds of the Venezuelan Andes
blue-lored antbird
Taxonomy articles created by Polbot
Taxobox binomials not recognized by IUCN